Palpita citrina is a moth in the family Crambidae. It was described by Herbert Druce in 1902. It is found in Ecuador and Costa Rica.

References

Moths described in 1902
Palpita
Moths of Central America
Moths of South America